Marine composite propellers are ship propellers, usually made from fiber composites like glass or carbon-fibers infused with a high-strength resin like epoxy or polyimide. These composites are made from strong, light and high-tech materials. Such composite propellers can be produced in several ways, including vacuum infused molding and injection molding processes, depending on size and resin viscosity.

Advantages 
The composite propellers can be made with Lay-Up process which causes anisotropic properties. This can be designed to create a passive adaptation of the propeller blades passive self-twisting propeller. Self-twisting blades are much more energy-efficient compared to rigid propeller blades. Passive adaptation in form might also be affected by propeller geometry.

Lower unit production cost and production without heat are the main advantages of composite material. While the initial cost of a composite propeller is usually comparable to aluminum. It is significantly less than a stainless steel propeller. Additionally, replaceable blades offer significant savings compared to repairing metal propellers. Another advantage to using composite propellers is that it is a lightweight material. The composite material is about half the weight of aluminum and 1/6 the weight of a stainless-steel propeller. A lightweight propeller reduces the amount of wear and tear on the entire boat.

Effect on the environment 
Composite materials are an environmentally friendly option as the corrosive resistance and resistance to impact damage of composites can lead to a long lifetime in composite propellers. When a composite propeller hits debris, the propeller absorbs the impact energy instead of transferring it to the lower unit; therefore, providing more protection for the drive train. Corrosion from saltwater and electrolysis are basically nonexistent with composite material in water. Still, the water saturation of the propellers and the propeller application cause some problems to the longevity of composite propellers. The corrosive resistant properties of composites cannot be said to be undeniably better than traditional metal alloys in the propeller application with today's technology.

References

External links 
 Living in a Material World at piranhapropellers.com

Propellers